Her Private Life is a surviving 1929 American pre-Code drama film directed by Alexander Korda and starring Billie Dove, Walter Pidgeon and Holmes Herbert. The plot concerns an English aristocrat who causes a scandal when she divorces her husband and runs off with a young American. The film had been considered a lost film. However, in July 2016, according to the Library of Congress, the film was found in an Italian archive.

This was Korda's second sound film, following The Squall. It is a remake of the 1925 silent film Déclassée by Robert G. Vignola, which was itself an adaptation of a 1919 play of the same name by Zoë Akins.

Cast
 Billie Dove as Lady Helen Haden 
 Walter Pidgeon as Ned Thayer 
 Holmes Herbert as Rudolph Solomon 
 Montagu Love as Sir Bruce Haden 
 Thelma Todd as Mrs. Leslie 
 Roland Young as Charteris 
 Mary Forbes as Lady Wildering 
 Brandon Hurst as Sir Emmett Wildering 
 ZaSu Pitts as Timmins

See also
List of early Warner Bros. sound and talking features

References

Bibliography
 Kulik, Karol. Alexander Korda: The Man Who Could Work Miracles. Virgin Books, 1990.

External links

lobby poster
2nd lobby poster

1929 films
1929 drama films
American drama films
Remakes of American films
American black-and-white films
1920s English-language films
American films based on plays
Films directed by Alexander Korda
Films set in England
First National Pictures films
Sound film remakes of silent films
1920s rediscovered films
Rediscovered American films
1920s American films